The Public Archives and Records Office is the official government archive of the Canadian province of Prince Edward Island. It is located at 175 Richmond Street in  Charlottetown.

It includes resources for genealogy and archival collections. As of 2018, it is administratively part of the Department of Education, Early Learning and Culture.

References

External links
Official site
Archives Council of Prince Edward Island
The Public Archives and Records Office is located at 

Prince Edward Island government departments and agencies
Archives in Canada
History of Prince Edward Island